Smif-N-Wessun: The Album is the fourth studio album by American hip hop duo Smif-N-Wessun. It was released on October 23, 2007 through Duck Down Music. Production was handled primarily by Swedish rapper and producer Ken Ring and Norwegian producer Tommy Tee, along with Rune Rotter, Soul Theory and Collen & Webb. It features guest appearances from the Loudmouf Choir, Chukki Star, Joell Ortiz, Million Stylez and Rock.

Track listing

Personnel
Darrell "Steele" Yates Jr. – main artist, executive producer
Tekomin "Tek" Williams – main artist
Anthony "Chukki Star" Williams – featured artist (track 2)
The Loudmouf Choir – featured artists (tracks: 4, 13)
Kenshin "Million Stylez" Iryo – featured artist (track 6)
Joell Ortiz – featured artist (track 7)
Jahmal "Rock" Bush – featured artist (track 7)
Ken Ring Kiprono – producer, executive producer, recording, mixing, arranger
Patric Collen – producer (tracks: 1-3, 7, 9, 14), recording, mixing, arranger
Peter Webb – producer (tracks: 1-3, 7, 9, 14), recording, mixing, arranger
Tommy Flåten – producer (tracks: 8, 10, 11, 13), recording, mixing, arranger
Dan Humiston – recording, mixing, arranger
Michael Sarsfield – mastering
Kenyatta "Buckshot" Blake – associate executive producer
Drew "Dru-Ha" Friedman – associate executive producer
Skrilla Design – art direction, design
Fubz – photography
Sven "Svengali" Debacki – additional artwork

References

External links

Smif-N-Wessun Interview at dropmagazine.com

2007 albums
Smif-n-Wessun albums
Duck Down Music albums